The Clarke River is a river in the Grey District, one of three Clarke rivers in the South island of New Zealand.
It flows northwest for 12 kilometres before joining with the upper Grey River close to the boundary of Victoria Forest Park.

References
 New Zealand 1:50,000 Topographic Map Series sheet BT21 - Waiuta

Grey District